Love Is the Law is the sixth studio album by Mentallo & The Fixer, released on April 18, 2000 by Metropolis Records.

Reception
Mattias Huss of Release Magazine gave Love Is the Law a mixed review, saying "Gary's work is fumbling about uncertainly, turning over some interesting stones but never really stopping to look under them" and "no track really makes a mark in this unwholesome wholeness, but promise is hiding in there."

Track listing

Personnel
Adapted from the Love Is the Law liner notes.

Mentallo & The Fixer
 Gary Dassing (as Mentallo) – programming, producer, engineering, mixing

Additional musicians
 Robert Bustamante – recording, engineering, mixing and drum programming (11)
 Michael Greene – vocals (5)
 Todd Kreth – guitar

Production and design
 Dwayne Dassing – mastering
 Daryl Litts – design

Release history

References

External links 
 
 Love Is the Law at iTunes

2000 albums
Mentallo & The Fixer albums
Metropolis Records albums